Henri Dobler (1863–1941) was a Swiss art collector, painter, poet and art critic. He is best known for refurbishing the Pavillon Vendôme in Aix-en-Provence, France, from 1906 to 1914.

Biography

Early life
Henri Dobler was born in 1863 in Switzerland. His parents sold silk and textiles in Marseille.

Adult life
He started his career in the French Army. In 1895, he gave up on his military ambitions and focused on art. He started collecting art, wrote a poetry book, and started painting. His paintings dealt with mythology and romanticism. However, it is thought that his paintings were not very successful because of a personal and vocal rift he had with Paul Cézanne, whose work he called "dirty paintings" and "the biggest scam of the century".

In 1906, he purchased the Pavillon Vendôme in Aix-en-Provence and refurbished it until 1914. He also took pains to add furniture specifically from Provence to the house. Meanwhile, he also wrote books about the history of architecture in Aix-en-Provence and Marseille.

Hubert de Courcy painted his portrait.

Death
He died in 1941.

Bibliography
La Petite Sirène (1899)
La maison de rêve (1900)
Les Vestiges des architectures et des arts décoratifs provençaux aux XVIIe et XVIIIe siècles à Aix-en-Provence (1910)
Les Vestiges des architectures et des arts décoratifs provençaux aux XVIIe et XVIIIe siècles à Marseille (1913)
Six mois de journalisme indépendant en province (1922)
Le cadre de la vie mondaine à Aix-en-Provence aux XVIIe et XVIIIe siècles: Boudoirs et jardins (1928)

References

1863 births
1941 deaths
People from Aix-en-Provence
Swiss art collectors
19th-century Swiss painters
Swiss male painters
20th-century Swiss painters
20th-century Swiss poets
20th-century male writers
Swiss male poets
Swiss non-fiction writers
Male non-fiction writers
19th-century Swiss male artists
20th-century Swiss male artists